Erastus J.O. Mwencha (November 15, 1947) is a  Kenyan businessman who served as  a Secretary-General of the Common Market for Eastern and Southern Africa and former Deputy Chairperson of the African Union Commission, to which he was elected on February 6, 2008.  On January 30, 2017, he was succeeded as Deputy Chairperson of the AU Commission by Ghana diplomat Thomas Kwasi Quartey.

He is married with three children.

Honors
  Order of the Rising Sun, 2nd Class, Gold and Silver Star (2020)

References

External links
 Secretary-General bio

1947 births
Living people
People from Kisii County
Kenyan diplomats
University of Nairobi alumni
Recipients of the Order of the Rising Sun, 2nd class